The Screen Actors Guild Award for Outstanding Performance by a Male Actor in a Leading Role in a Motion Picture is an award given by the Screen Actors Guild to honor the finest acting achievements in film.

Winners and nominees

1990s

2000s

2010s

2020s
{| class="wikitable" width="87%" cellpadding="5"
|-
! width="7%"| Year
! width="31%"| Nominee
! width="31%"| Film
! width="31%"| Role(s)
|-
| rowspan="5" align="center"| 2020
(27th) 
| style="background:#FAEB86;"| Chadwick Boseman  (posthumous)
| style="background:#FAEB86;"| Ma Rainey's Black Bottom
| style="background:#FAEB86;"| Levee Green
|-
| Riz Ahmed 
| Sound of Metal
| Ruben Stone
|-
| Anthony Hopkins 
| The Father
| Anthony
|-
| Gary Oldman 
| Mank
| Herman J. Mankiewicz
|-
| Steven Yeun 
| Minari
| Jacob Yi
|-
| rowspan="5" align="center"| 2021
(28th) 
| style="background:#FAEB86;" | Will Smith
| style="background:#FAEB86;" | King Richard
| style="background:#FAEB86;" | Richard Williams
|-
| Javier Bardem
| Being the Ricardos
| Desi Arnaz
|-
| Benedict Cumberbatch
| The Power of the Dog
| Phil Burbank
|-
| Andrew Garfield
| Tick, Tick...Boom!
| Jonathan Larson
|-
| Denzel Washington
| The Tragedy of Macbeth
| Lord Macbeth
|-
|rowspan="6" align="center"| 2022
(29th) 
| style="background:#FAEB86;" | Brendan Fraser
| style="background:#FAEB86;" | The Whale
| style="background:#FAEB86;" | Charlie
|-
|Austin Butler || Elvis || Elvis Presley 
|-
|Colin Farrell || The Banshees of Inisherin || Pádraic Súilleabháin
|-
|Bill Nighy || Living || Mr. Williams 
|-
|Adam Sandler || Hustle || Stanley Sugerman
|-
|}

Superlatives

Multiple winners
Three wins
 Daniel Day-Lewis (Gangs of New York  (2002), There Will Be Blood  (2007), Lincoln  (2012))

Multiple nominees
Note: Winners are indicated in bold type.

Two nominations
 Christian Bale (Vice (2018), Ford v Ferrari (2019))
 Jeff Bridges (Crazy Heart (2009), True Grit (2010))
 Nicolas Cage (Leaving Las Vegas (1995), Adaptation. (2002))
 Bradley Cooper (Silver Linings Playbook (2012), A Star is Born (2018))
 Benedict Cumberbatch (The Imitation Game (2014), The Power of the Dog (2021))
 Robert Duvall (The Apostle (1997), Get Low (2010))
 Colin Firth (A Single Man (2009), The King's Speech (2010))
 James Franco (127 Hours (2010), The Disaster Artist (2017))
 Morgan Freeman (The Shawshank Redemption (1994), Invictus (2009))
 Andrew Garfield (Hacksaw Ridge (2016), Tick, Tick... Boom! (2021))
 Philip Seymour Hoffman (Flawless (1999), Capote (2005))
 Anthony Hopkins (Nixon (1995), The Father (2020))
 Jack Nicholson (As Good as It Gets (1997), About Schmidt (2002))
 Gary Oldman (The Darkest Hour  (2017), Mank   (2020))
 Eddie Redmayne (The Theory of Everything (2014), The Danish Girl (2015))
 Joaquin Phoenix (Walk the Line (2005), Joker (2019))
 Brad Pitt (The Curious Case of Benjamin Button (2008), Moneyball (2011))
 Geoffrey Rush (Shine (1996), Quills (2000))
 Will Smith (The Pursuit of Happyness (2006), King Richard (2021))
 Forest Whitaker (The Last King of Scotland (2006), The Butler (2013))

Three nominations
 George Clooney (Michael Clayton (2007), Up in the Air (2009), The Descendants (2011))
 Daniel Day-Lewis (Gangs of New York (2002), There Will Be Blood (2007), Lincoln (2012))
 Johnny Depp (Pirates of the Caribbean: The Curse of the Black Pearl (2003), Finding Neverland (2004), Black Mass (2015))
 Ryan Gosling (Half Nelson (2006), Lars and the Real Girl (2007), La La Land (2016))
 Viggo Mortensen (Eastern Promises (2007), Captain Fantastic (2016), Green Book (2018))

Four nominations
 Russell Crowe (The Insider (1999), Gladiator (2000), A Beautiful Mind (2001), Cinderella Man (2005))
 Tom Hanks (Forrest Gump (1994), Saving Private Ryan (1998), Cast Away (2000), Captain Phillips  (2013))
 Sean Penn (Dead Man Walking (1995), I Am Sam (2001), Mystic River (2003), Milk (2008))

Five nominations
 Leonardo DiCaprio  (The Aviator (2004), Blood Diamond (2006), J. Edgar (2011), The Revenant (2015), Once Upon a Time in Hollywood (2019))

Six nominations
 Denzel Washington (The Hurricane (1999), Training Day (2001), Flight (2012), Fences (2016), Roman J. Israel, Esq. (2017), The Tragedy of Macbeth'' (2021))

See also
 Academy Award for Best Actor
 Golden Globe Award for Best Actor – Motion Picture Drama
 Golden Globe Award for Best Actor – Motion Picture Musical or Comedy
 BAFTA Award for Best Actor in a Leading Role
 Critics' Choice Movie Award for Best Actor
 Independent Spirit Award for Best Male Lead

External links
 SAG Awards official site

Male Actor Leading Role
 
Film awards for lead actor